Oliva is a town in Spain.

Oliva may also refer to:

Places
Oliva de Plasencia, municipality in Spain
Oliva de Mérida, municipality in Spain
Oliva de la Frontera, municipality in Spain
Oliva, Córdoba, town in Argentina
Oliva Gessi, commune in Italy
Villa Oliva, village in Paraguay
La Oliva, Fuerteventura, Spain
Santa María de la Oliva, monastery in Navarre
German and Latin name for Oliwa, Poland

People
Oliva (surname)
Oliva of Brescia (died 138), saint
Abbot Oliva (971–1046), Count of Berga
Christian of Oliva (fl. 1180–1245), first Bishop of Prussia
Oliva Sabuco (1562 – c. 1646), Spanish writer

Other
Oliva Cigar Co., a brand of handmade cigars
Oliva (gastropod), a genus of marine gastropods
, a German fishing trawler launched in 1920 and renamed in that year
MS Oliva, a bulk carrier wrecked in 2011

See also
Olivary body
Oliwa (disambiguation)